Hyderabad–Khokhrapar Branch Line is one of several branch lines in Pakistan, operated and maintained by Pakistan Railways. The line begins from Kotri Junction station and ends at Zero Point station. There are 23 railway stations from Kotri Junction to Zero Point.

History

The Hyderabad–Khokhrapar Branch Line was originally built as part of the Hyderabad–Jodhpur Railway in 1892. The first section from Hyderabad to Shadipalli opened in 1892 and was  originally constructed as a  broad gauge railway line (this first section was also known as the Hyderabad–Umarkot Railway). In 1901, the first section was converted to  metre gauge where it joined the second section between Shadipalli and Luni and on wards to Jodhpur. In February 2006, the entire Hyderabad–Khokhrapar line was re-converted again back to the original to 1676 mm broad gauge line.

Stations
The stations on this line are as follows:

See also
 Karachi–Peshawar Railway Line
 Railway lines in Pakistan

References

Railway stations on Hyderabad–Khokhrapar Branch Line
5 ft 6 in gauge railways in Pakistan